Diocese of Syrmia (also Srem, or Srijem) may refer to:

 Serbian Orthodox Diocese of Syrmia, an Eastern Orthodox diocese of the Serbian Orthodox Church in Serbia
 Roman Catholic Diocese of Syrmia, one of dioceses of Roman Catholic Church in Serbia

See also
 Syrmia
 Bishopric of Syrmia (disambiguation)
 Eastern Orthodoxy in Serbia
 Catholic Church in Serbia